The 1977 Virginia Slims of San Francisco, was a women's tennis tournament that took place on indoor carpet courts at the Civic Auditorium in San Francisco in the United States. It was the seventh edition of the event, which was part of the Virginia Slims Circuit, and was held from February 27, through March 6, 1977. The final was watched by 5,932 spectators who saw second-seeded Sue Barker win the singles title, earning her $20,000 first-prize money.

Finals

Singles
 Sue Barker defeated  Virginia Wade 6–3, 6–4

Doubles
 Kerry Reid /  Greer Stevens defeated  Sue Barker /  Ann Kiyomura 6–3, 6–1

Prize money

References

VS of San Francisco
VS of San Francisco
Silicon Valley Classic
Virginia Slims of San Francisco
Virginia Slims of San Francisco
Virginia Slims of San Francisco